Karsten Brandt (born 14 September 1958) is an East German former cross-country skier. He competed in the men's 15 kilometre event at the 1984 Winter Olympics. Brandt was also a twelve-time national champion in East Germany.

References

External links
 

1958 births
Living people
German male cross-country skiers
Olympic cross-country skiers of East Germany
Cross-country skiers at the 1984 Winter Olympics
People from Wernigerode
Sportspeople from Saxony-Anhalt